Caecilia leucocephala is a species of caecilian in the family Caeciliidae. It is found in Colombia, Ecuador, and Panama. Its natural habitats are subtropical or tropical moist lowland forests, plantations, rural gardens, and heavily degraded former forest.

References

leucocephala
Amphibians of Colombia
Amphibians of Ecuador
Amphibians of Panama
Amphibians described in 1968
Taxonomy articles created by Polbot